Eugen Schmidt (born 23 October 1975) is a German politician for the AfD and since 2021 member of the Bundestag, the federal diet.

Life and politics 

Schmidt was born 1975 in the Soviet city of Oskemen and became German in 1993. 
Schmidt was elected to the Bundestag in 2021.

References 

Living people
1975 births
People from Oskemen
Members of the Bundestag 2021–2025
21st-century German politicians